Surajudeen Ishola Adekunbi is a Nigerian businessman and member of the Ogun State House of Assembly, where he is its incumbent Speaker.

Early life
Born in Ayetoro, a town in Ogun State in southwestern Nigeria, Adekunbi is one of fifteen children of Rahmon and Elizabeth Adekunbi.

He attended St. Paul African Church Primary School, Ayetoro, before proceeding to Comprehensive High School, Aiyetoro, where he obtained a School Certificate in 1993. He obtained his National Diploma in Mechanical Engineering from Federal Polytechnic, Ilaro in 1996, and then his Higher National Diploma from The Polytechnic, Ibadan. He later earned a Post-Graduate Diploma at Federal University of Technology Akure, as well as a Master's degree in Project Development and Implementation in 2011 from the University of Ibadan.

Career And Politics
Adekunbi started his career by working as a Project Assistant at Nigerian Petroleum Development Company (NPDC) in Edo state during his National Youth Service Corps in the year 2000. After his Youth Service, he taught at Government Technical College, Idi-Aba, Abeokuta. He later joined the Ogun State Civil Service working in the Bureau of Transportation from 2004 to 2006, before resigning to join his father's company, Al-Rahman Oil & Gas Limited.

In 2007, he contested the Ogun State House of Assembly seat of Egbado North (now Yewa North) but lost. In 2011 he re-contested under the platform of the Action Congress of Nigeria (ACN) and won. He was also elected as Speaker of the House. and re-elected as Speaker in 2015.

References

Living people
People from Ogun State
Legislative speakers in Nigeria
1975 births
All Progressives Congress politicians